Cornwall Council is the unitary authority for Cornwall in the United Kingdom, not including the Isles of Scilly, which has its own unitary council. The council, and its predecessor Cornwall County Council, has a tradition of large groups of independent councillors, having been controlled by independents in the 1970s and 1980s. Since the 2021 elections, it has been under the control of the Conservative Party.

Cornwall Council provides a wide range of services to the approximately half a million people who live in Cornwall. In 2014 it had an annual budget of more than £1 billion and was the biggest employer in Cornwall with a staff of 12,429 salaried workers. It is responsible for services including: schools, social services, rubbish collection, roads, planning and more.

History

Establishment of the unitary authority

On 5 December 2007, the Government confirmed that Cornwall was one of five councils that would move to unitary status. This was enacted by statutory instrument as part of the 2009 structural changes to local government in England, The changes took effect on 1 April 2009. On that date the six districts and Cornwall County Council were abolished and were replaced by Cornwall Council.

Devolution
The campaign for Cornish devolution began in 2000 with the founding of the Cornish Constitutional Convention, a cross-party, cross-sector association that campaigns for devolution to Cornwall. In 2009, Liberal Democrat MP Dan Rogerson introduced a bill in parliament seeking to take power from Whitehall and regional quangos and pass it to the new Cornwall Council, with the intention of transforming the new council into an assembly along the lines of National Assembly for Wales. In November 2010, British Prime Minister David Cameron suggested in comments to the local press that his government would "devolve a lot of power to Cornwall – that will go to the Cornish unitary authority." In 2011, the then Deputy Prime Minister Nick Clegg said he would meet a cross party group, including the six Cornish MPs, to look at whether more powers could be devolved to Cornwall. The subsequent Localism Act 2011 was expected to achieve this but it proved incapable. However, the Cities and Local Government Devolution Act 2016 is intended to devolve some powers to Cornwall Council, helping to bring social and care services together, and giving control over bus services and local investment.
In July 2015, a Cornwall Devolution Deal was agreed with the Government for devolution to Cornwall from London, which gives Cornwall greater powers over public sector funding. Cornwall was the first authority to agree a devolution deal with the Government. This was agreed following the submission of the successful Case for Cornwall.

Cultural services
Among the services provided by the council is a public library service which consists of a main library in Truro and smaller libraries in towns and some villages throughout Cornwall. There are also the following special libraries: Cornwall Learning Library, Cornish Studies Library, the Education Library Service, and the Performing Arts Library, as well as a mobile library service based at Threemilestone.

Cultural projects
Cornwall Council is promoting ten cultural projects as part of a five-year culture strategy. One project is the development of a National Theatre of Cornwall, a collaboration of the Hall for Cornwall, Kneehigh Theatre, Eden Project and Wildworks. Cornwall Council has based its idea on the successful National Theatres of Scotland and Wales.

Another of the projects is the proposed creation of a National Library of Cornwall to resolve inadequacies with the current storage of archives. It is hoped that this will bring some important documents concerning Cornish history back to Cornwall as well as providing better public access to those records already held. Cornwall Council is also involved in the project to build a Stadium for Cornwall.

Cornish ethnic and national identity
Cornwall Council backs the campaign for the Cornish to be recognised as a National Minority in the UK. The council's then chief executive Kevin Lavery wrote a letter to the Government in 2010, writing, "Cornwall Council firmly believes that the UK Government should recognise the Cornish as a national minority under the terms of the Framework Convention." Adding that, "Cornwall Council believes that the Government's current restricted interpretation is discriminatory against the Cornish and contradicts the support it gives to Cornish culture and identity through its own departments." Cornwall Council's support was officially reaffirmed as council policy in 2011 with the publication of the Cornish National Minority Report 2, signed and endorsed by the then leaders of every political grouping on the council. The council took an active role in the promotion of the options for registering Cornish ethnicity and national identity on the 2011 UK Census. The Cornish people were finally recognised as a National Minority by the British Government on 24 April 2014 and incorporated into the European Framework Convention for the Protection of National Minorities giving the Cornish the same status as the United Kingdom's other Celtic peoples, the Scots, the Welsh and the Irish.

International relations
Since 2008 Cornwall Council and the former county council, together with Cornwall Enterprise, and Cornwall Sustainable Energy Partnership, have been involved with a Protocol of Cooperation between Cornwall and the Conseil général du Finistère in Brittany. The protocol aims to allow the two regions to work more closely on topics of common interest and engage in a knowledge exchange with the possibility of jointly applying for European funding. Cornwall is also a member of the Conference of Peripheral Maritime Regions, a partnership of European regions, which aims to promote and highlight the value of these regions to Europe. Cornwall comes under the Atlantic Arc Commission sub-division of 30 regions, which has been used to advertise the potential of renewable energy off the Cornish coast to Europe.

A scheme arising from these partnerships is MERiFIC (Marine Energy in Far Peripheral and Island Communities) which seeks to advance the adoption of marine energy across the two regions, including the Isles of Scilly. The project has received £4 million of European funding that will be spent in Cornwall and Brittany.

Cornwall County Council organised an event in Brussels in 2008 to promote various aspects of Cornwall, including the Cornish language, food and drink and showcasing Cornwall's design industry. This was part of the Celtic Connections programme of events put together by the Celtic nations as a showcase for culture in Europe.

Various fact finding missions have been organised by councillors to study how other regions and small nations of Europe govern themselves successfully. Independent councillor, Bert Biscoe, organised a fact finding mission to Guernsey in 2011 to see if the island's system of government could be adapted to work in Cornwall.

Since 2010 Cornwall Council has been a full observer member of the British–Irish Council due to the Cornish language falling under the BIC's areas of work.

Economic projects
Cornwall Council, in partnership with the Eden Project, is bidding to have the world's first Green Investment Bank based in Cornwall. The council is also working with the NHS and Eden to tackle fuel poverty by creating a Cornwall Together co-op which will buy electricity at lower-than-market prices. No further progress has been made on this since it was originally proposed.

Cornwall Council are servicing nearly 30 long term lender option borrower option loans (LOBOs) totalling £394 million. The council is locked into some of the deals until the year 2078, paying interest at more than double the current market rate.

Composition

The council has 87 councillors. This has been the case since the 2021 elections, implementing the independent Local Government Boundary Commission for England’s proposal. Until then, the council had 123 councillors.

The composition of Cornwall Council following changes after the 2021 election is:

Cabinet
The cabinet consists of Linda Taylor, the Council Leader, and nine other cabinet members. It consists of 10 Conservatives.

Electoral wards

Between 2009 and 2021, the council had 123 seats. Currently, the county (not including the Isles of Scilly) is divided into 87 wards, with each ward returning one councillor. Some wards are coterminous with civil parishes, though most consist of multiple parishes or parts of parishes.

Elections and changes

2009 Cornwall Council elections

Elections for the new unitary Cornwall Council were held on 4 June 2009 and there were 123 members elected, replacing the previous 82 councillors on Cornwall County Council and the 249 on the six district councils. The outgoing Cornwall County Council had 48 Liberal Democrat members, nine Conservatives, five Labour, one from the small Liberal Party with the remaining 19 seats held by Independent candidates. Mebyon Kernow had no county councillors, but nine district councillors, before the two-tier system was abolished.

The Lib Dems lost overall control of Cornwall Council to 'no overall control' – this means that no single party has overall control of the new council despite the Conservatives have the largest number of councillors, however they do not have enough for a majority control. The cabinet of the council was therefore formed as a coalition between the Conservatives and the Independent bloc. The Conservatives received 34% of the vote (50 seats), followed by the Liberal Democrats on 28% (38 seats), the Independents on 23% (32 seats) and Mebyon Kernow on 4% (3 seats). The turnout was 41%. Labour, the Green Party, UKIP and the BNP failed to secure any seats in Cornwall.

By-elections and defections, 2009 to 2013
In August 2010, Neil Plummer of Stithians left the Independent group and joined Mebyon Kernow. He later left Mebyon Kernow and stood for re-election as an independent.

In June 2011 Liskeard North councillor Jan Powell defected from the Conservatives to join the Liberal Democrats.

In May 2012 two Liberal Democrat councillors left the Liberal Democrat group to join the Independent Group. Chris Pascoe, the councillor for Threemilestone and Gloweth, resigned in protest over the national actions of the Liberal Democrat party and the introduction of the "pasty tax". Graham Walker, councillor for St Austell Bethel, defected in protest over the coalition government's education policies.

In September 2012 another Liberal Democrat councillor resigned from the party. Tamsin Williams, the member for Penzance Central, defected to Mebyon Kernow, having previously been a member of it in the 1990s. She was the second member to defect to Mebyon Kernow since 2009, and her change of allegiance came after "bad decisions made by the London parties." During the same month of September 2012, one Independent councillor, Lisa Dolley, left the council's Independent Group to become an ungrouped independent.

In March 2013 Conservative cabinet member for Looe East, Armand Toms, defected to the Independents over the party's decision to freeze Council Tax rather than increase it.

A total of 5 by-elections were held to Cornwall Council in the 2009–2013 term of office. They are illustrated in the table below.

2013 Cornwall Council elections

The Conservatives lost 18 seats, meaning they were no longer the largest group in the council. A new coalition was formed, between the Independents and the Liberal Democrats.

By-elections and defections, 2013 to 2017
In February 2016, the Independent councillor for Redruth North, Lisa Dolley, who had been Deputy Leader of the Independent group on the council, defected to the Liberal Democrats. She later left the Liberal Democrats and designated herself as a standalone independent in December of that year.

In September 2016 Paul White, the Conservative councillor for Camborne Roskear, left the Conservative group and designated himself as a standalone independent.

In December 2016 Hanna Toms, the Labour councillor for Falmouth Penwerris, was expelled from the Labour group after pleading guilty to two counts of benefits fraud before Truro Magistrates Court. She continued to sit as a standalone independent.

Later in December 2016 Jon Stoneman, the Conservative councillor for Camborne Trelowarren, left the Conservative group and designated himself as a standalone independent.

A total of 14 by-elections were held to Cornwall Council in the 2013–2017 term of office. They are illustrated in the table below.

2017 Cornwall Council elections

The Cornwall Council elections were held on 4 May 2017. The Conservatives increased their seat tally to win a plurality of seats, but the Liberal Democrat/Independent coalition continued with a reduced majority.

By-elections and defections, 2017 to 2021
The May 2017 election in the Bodmin St Petroc ward was delayed following the death of Liberal Democrat candidate Steve Rogerson and was held on 8 June, remaining vacant in the interim. The subsequent election was won by Liberal Democrat Leigh Frost.

A by-election was held in the Falmouth Smithick division on 1 February 2018 following the death of Labour councillor and former Falmouth and Camborne MP Candy Atherton. The by-election was won by Labour's Jayne Kirkham.

Grenville and Stratton councillor, Paula Dolphin, resigned from the Liberal Democrats on 20 February 2018, continuing to sit as a standalone Independent.

On 1 March 2018 the leader of the Labour group on the council and councillor for Penzance East, Tim Dwelly, resigned from the party, citing internal disputes within the party, particularly in association with Momentum. He continued to sit as an Independent.

In August 2020, councillors Dulcie Tudor, Bob Egerton and Andrew Wallis formed the Independent Alliance, a new independent grouping on the council. All three councillors had been a part of the Council's ruling coalition - Tudor resigned from the Liberal Democrats and Egerton and Wallis from the larger Independent group.

In March 2021, the deputy leader of the Council Adam Paynter was suspended from the Liberal Democrats for 12 months over allegations he shared an email from former Liberal Democrat councillor Dulcie Tudor without permission. Paynter remained both a councillor and the Council's deputy leader, sitting as an independent. The Conservative group on the Council called on Julian German, the leader of the Council, to remove Paynter, calling his conduct "reprehensible" and threatening to table a motion of no confidence in him if he did not. Paynter appealed his suspension and stood as an independent in the 2021 Cornwall Council election.

In April 2021, the Conservative leader Linda Taylor put forward a motion to remove Julian German as council leader after he refused to fire Paynter as deputy leader. As per the council's constitution, the motion was signed by 41 of the 123 council members.

2021 Cornwall Council elections

Council history

Party control
The following table shows party control of the Cornwall Council:

Notable members
Dick Cole, leader of Mebyon Kernow and member for St Dennis and St Enoder
Loveday Jenkin, deputy leader of Mebyon Kernow and member for Crowan, Sithney and Wendron

See also

 Council of the Isles of Scilly
 Cornish Nationalism

Notes

References

External links

 

Organisations based in Cornwall
Unitary authority councils of England
Leader and cabinet executives
Local education authorities in England
Local authorities in Cornwall
Billing authorities in England